FLYeasy was an Indian low-cost airline based at Kempegowda International Airport, Bengaluru.  The company slogan is When You Value Time and Money.

Fleet
They have planned to lease 1 Embraer E190s.

Mergers and acquisitions
In December 2017, FLYeasy purchased 74% of Air Pegasus, a defunct regional airline, for over ₹70 crore.

Controversy
The airline was accused of fraud and 'cheating' by numerous young pilots who claim that they have been promised jobs by FLYeasy.

References

Companies based in Bangalore
Defunct airlines of India
Indian companies established in 2014
Indian companies disestablished in 2015
2014 establishments in Karnataka
Airlines established in 2014
Airlines disestablished in 2015